The Triumph Speed Twin 1200 is a standard motorcycle made by Triumph Motorcycles Ltd that is a modern successor of the original Triumph Speed Twin from 1938. Part of the Triumph Bonneville range, this 1200cc bike was designed to slot in between the 900cc Triumph Street Twin (now renamed the Speed Twin 900) and the heavier 1200cc Triumph Thruxton.

For 2021 and Euro5, it received a mild refresh including higher spec Brembo front brakes, upside down Marzocchi front forks, slightly more peak power and a 500 rpm rev limiter increase, plus small cosmetic tweaks visually.

See also 
 Triumph Speed Twin 900

External links 

 Bonneville Speed Twin

References

Speed Twin 1200
Standard motorcycles